Gonzales v. Raich (previously Ashcroft v. Raich), 545 U.S. 1 (2005), was a decision by the U.S. Supreme Court ruling that under the Commerce Clause of the U.S. Constitution, Congress may criminalize the production and use of homegrown cannabis even if state law allows its use for medicinal purposes.

Background
California voters passed Proposition 215 in 1996, legalizing the use of medical marijuana. The Federal government of the United States has limited the use of marijuana since the Marijuana Tax Act of 1937 was enacted. 

Defendant Angel Raich used homegrown medical marijuana, which was legal under California law but illegal under federal law. On August 15, 2002, Butte County Sheriff's Department officers and agents from the federal Drug Enforcement Administration destroyed all six of California resident Diane Monson's marijuana plants, facing light resistance. The marijuana plants were illegal Schedule I drugs under the federal Controlled Substances Act (CSA), which is Title II of the Comprehensive Drug Abuse Prevention and Control Act of 1970. Monson and Raich sued, claiming that enforcing Federal law against them would violate the Commerce Clause, the Due Process Clause of the Fifth Amendment, the Ninth Amendment, the Tenth Amendment, and the doctrine of medical necessity.

Raich's physician stated that without marijuana, Raich is threatened by excruciating pain. California was one of 14 states at the time (36 as of 2021) that allowed medicinal use of marijuana. California's Compassionate Use Act allows limited use of marijuana for medicinal purposes.

Raich and Monson's case
Raich of Oakland, California, Monson of Oroville, California, and two anonymous caregivers sued the government for injunctive and declaratory relief on October 9, 2002, to stop the government from interfering with their right to produce and use medical marijuana claiming that the CSA was not constitutional, as applied to their conduct. Raich and Monson were represented by Randy Barnett.

Raich claimed she used marijuana to keep herself alive. She and her doctor also claimed to have tried dozens of prescription medicines for her numerous medical conditions and that she was allergic to most of them. Her doctor  declared under oath that Raich's life was at stake if she could not continue to use marijuana.

Monson suffered from chronic pain from a car accident a decade before the case. She used marijuana to relieve the pain and muscle spasms around her spine.

Government's case
The Controlled Substances Act does not recognize the medical use of marijuana. Agents from the federal Drug Enforcement Administration were assigned to break up California's medical marijuana co-ops and to seize their assets. That was result of the fact that federal law pre-empted, under the Supremacy Clause, the law of California.  The government argued that if a single exception were made to the Controlled Substances Act, it would become unenforceable in practice. The government also contended that consuming one's locally grown marijuana for medical purposes affects the interstate market of marijuana and the federal government may thus regulate and prohibit such consumption.

That argument stems from the landmark New Deal case Wickard v. Filburn, which held that the government may regulate personal cultivation and consumption of crops because of the aggregate effect of individual consumption on the government's legitimate statutory framework governing the interstate wheat market.

Litigation
On December 16, 2003, the Ninth Circuit Court of Appeals granted a preliminary injunction to prevent the federal government from interfering with Raich and Monson: "We find that the appellants have demonstrated a strong likelihood of success on their claim that, as applied to them, the Controlled Substances Act is an unconstitutional exercise of Congress' Commerce Clause authority."

Organizations involved
Partnership for a Drug-Free America, several other antidrug organizations, and an alliance of seven Representatives, including Mark Souder and Katherine Harris, all filed amicus briefs for the side of federal government. An environmentalist group, Community Rights Council, also filed a brief for the government for fear that limitation of federal power would undermine its agenda.

The Cato Institute, Institute for Justice, many libertarian organizations, and the National Organization for the Reform of Marijuana Laws, along with other groups opposing the War on Drugs, filed briefs for Raich and Monson. The governments of California, Maryland, and Washington also filed briefs supporting Raich. The attorneys general of Alabama, Louisiana, and Mississippi, three strongly antidrug states from the conservative South, filed a brief supporting Raich, on the grounds of states' rights.

Decision
The ruling was 6–3 with Justice Stevens writing the opinion of the court, joined by Justices Kennedy, Ginsburg, Souter and Breyer. A concurring opinion was filed by Justice Scalia.

The opinion began by pointing out that the respondents did not dispute that Congress had the power to control or ban marijuana for non-medical uses:

Banning the growing of marijuana for medical use, the Court reasoned, was a permissible way of preventing or limiting access to marijuana for other uses:

The relevant precedents for the Court's analysis are Wickard v. Filburn (1942), United States v. Lopez (1995), and United States v. Morrison (2000).

Scalia's opinion
Justice Scalia wrote a separate concurrence that had the effect of differentiating the decision from the previous results of United States v. Lopez and United States v. Morrison. In a departure from his Originalist interpretation of the Constitution (he voted for limits on the Commerce Clause in the Lopez and Morrison decisions), Scalia said his understanding of the Necessary and Proper Clause caused him to vote for the Commerce Clause with Raich for the following reason:

Dissenting opinions
Justice O'Connor dissented joined by Chief Justice William Rehnquist, who authored the majority opinions in United States v. Lopez and United States v. Morrison. O'Connor began her opinion by citing Lopez, which she followed with a reference to Justice Louis Brandeis's dissenting opinion in New State Ice Co. v. Liebmann:

She concluded:

Justice Thomas also wrote a separate dissent, stating in part:

Subsequent events
Both Raich and Monson have indicated their intention to continue using marijuana for medical use, in spite of the ruling and federal law on the subject.

Two days after the ruling, the International Narcotics Control Board issued a statement indicating that the Board "welcomes the decision of the United States Supreme Court, made on 6 June, reaffirming that the cultivation and use of cannabis, even if it is for 'medical' use, should be prohibited."

Its president, Hamid Ghodse, noted, "Cannabis is classified under international conventions as a drug with a number of personal and public health problems" and referred to the drug's Schedule I status, under the Single Convention on Narcotic Drugs.

Soon after the decision in Raich, the Supreme Court vacated a lower court decision in United States v. Stewart and remanded it to the court of appeals for reconsideration in light of Raich. On remand, the Ninth Circuit held that Congress had the Commerce Clause power to criminalize the possession of homemade machine guns, just as it had the power to criminalize homegrown marijuana.

In 2007, the Ninth Circuit decided against Raich, when she renewed her litigation on substantive due process grounds. Judge Harry Pregerson, the author of the opinion, noted that a minority of states had legalized medical marijuana but that under federal law, it is not a recognized "fundamental right" under the due process clause:

In 2009, the Department of Justice under Attorney General Eric Holder issued new guidelines allowing for no longer enforcing of the federal ban in some situations:

When C-SPAN's Brian Lamb interviewed former Justice John Paul Stevens about Stevens' book, Five Chiefs, Stevens cited Gonzales as a case in which he upheld the law even if he deplored the policy.

In Congress, to counter the effect of this ruling, Representative Maurice Hinchey (D-NY) and Dana Rohrabacher (R-CA) annually introduced legislation to stop the Department of Justice from arresting and prosecuting medical marijuana patients. This effort succeeded for the first time as the Rohrabacher–Farr amendment to the omnibus federal spending bill for the 2015 fiscal year (section 538), which was enacted on December 16, 2014.

In 2021, Justice Thomas revisited Gonzalez in a statement in Standing Akimbo, LLC v. United States. The case was brought by a Denver, CO dispensary by -  Thorburn Law Group, LLC with respect to 280E.  He noted that the reasoning in Gonzalez was predicated upon the need to prohibit intrastate trafficking of marijuana to "avoid a 'gaping hole' in Congress' 'closed regulatory system'" prohibiting interstate trafficking of marijuana.  Justice Thomas observed that the federal government's modern practice of turning a blind eye toward marijuana possession in the 36 states that have legalized it therefore undercut the reasoning in Gonzalez, suggesting that Gonzalez should be revisited.

See also
Separate sovereigns
 Wickard v. Filburn (1942)
 South Dakota v. Dole (1987)
Legal history of marijuana in the United States
List of United States Supreme Court cases, volume 545
Marijuana Control, Regulation, and Education Act
List of United States Supreme Court cases

References

External links 
 

United States Constitution Article One case law
United States Supreme Court cases
United States Commerce Clause case law
Medicinal use of cannabis
Cannabis law in the United States
United States controlled substances case law
2005 in United States case law
United States Supreme Court cases of the Rehnquist Court
2005 in cannabis
Cannabis in California
History of Butte County, California